is a Neptune trojan first observed on 7 June 2008 by American astronomers Scott Sheppard and Chad Trujillo using the Subaru telescope at Mauna Kea Observatories on Hawaii, United States. It was the first object found in Neptune's trailing  Lagrangian point and measures approximately 100 kilometers in diameter.

Orbit and classification 
Neptune trojans are resonant trans-Neptunian objects in a 1:1 mean-motion orbital resonance with Neptune. These trojans have a semi-major axis and an orbital period very similar to Neptune's (30.10 AU; 164.8 years).

 belongs to the trailing  group, which follow 60° behind Neptune's orbit. It orbits the Sun with a semi-major axis of 30.056 AU at a distance of 27.7–32.4 AU once every 164 years and 9 months (60,186 days). Its orbit has an eccentricity of 0.08 and an inclination of 27.4° with respect to the ecliptic. This object has the second highest inclination of any known Neptune trojan after , which has 29.3°.

Search for Neptune trojans 

The search for  trojans of Neptune has been impeded by the fact that this region of space is currently along the line of sight to the center of the Milky Way, an area of the sky crowded with stars.  was found in a location where background stars are obscured by a dust cloud. The discovery of one Neptune  trojan in a searched area of 19 square degrees suggests that there may be 150 Neptune  trojans with a diameter greater than ~80 km (24th magnitude), similar to the estimate of such objects in Neptune's  swarm.

New Horizons probe 

 was not close enough for investigation by the New Horizons spacecraft when it crossed Neptune's  region en route to Pluto in 2013–2014, but its discovery showed that other, more accessible Neptune trojans could potentially have been found before that time.  was 2 AU from Pluto in 1997.  crossed the ecliptic plane in 2011. , it is 33 AU from Neptune.

Physical characteristics 

The discoverers estimate that the body has a mean-diameter of 100 kilometers based on a magnitude of 23.2. Based on a generic magnitude-to-diameter conversion, it measures approximately 98 kilometers in diameter using an absolute magnitude of 8.2 with an assumed albedo of 0.10.

Numbering and naming 

Due to its orbital uncertainty, this minor planet has not been numbered and its official discoverers have not been determined. If named, it will follow the naming scheme already established with 385571 Otrera, which is to name these objects after figures related to the Amazons, an all-female warrior tribe that fought in the Trojan War on the side of the Trojans against the Greek.

References

External links 
 AstDys-2 about 
  
 
 

Minor planet object articles (unnumbered)

20080607